MTV Türkiye was a Turkish pay-television channel owned by Viacom. It launched on October 23, 2006.

History

Launch
MTV Türkiye's opening party was held on 17 November 2006 in Istanbul, with a Pussycat Dolls performance. It was officially launched on October 23, 2006. The first broadcast of the channel was Nil Karaibrahimgil's music video Peri.

Digiturk and MTVNI
MTV Turkey was removed from Digiturk on May 22 to 23, 2010 with no reason given to the customers, which caused a small controversy amongst customers. On June 20, 2010, it was reported that MTV Networks International cancelled Multichannel Developers's (the company that operated MTV Turkiye) licence a month ago. On the same day, MTV Turkiye's website closed with a text saying that their new site will be available as soon as possible. As of October 2010, the channel operates on cable TV (e.g. on D-Smart Ch. 63, see Digital television in Turkey) and free-to-air satellite.

The channel ceased broadcasting on August 31, 2011.

MTV Europe was aired instead of MTV Türkiye, on March 1, 2012 on channel 107 of the Digiturk platform.

Festivals/Special programming
 Sonisphere Festival (Istanbul,Turkey 2010)
 Freshtival, 2009
 Olympos Music Fest, 2008
 Electronica Festival, 2008
 Radar live, 2007

See also
 Dream TV (Turkey)
 Viacom International Media Networks (Europe)
 VIVA (TV station)
 MuchMusic
 Music of Turkey

References

External links
MTV TURKEY OFFICIAL WEBSITE
MTV TURKIYE CURRENTLY SCREENSHOTS

MTV
Defunct television channels in Turkey
Turkish-language television stations
Television channels and stations established in 2006
Television channels and stations disestablished in 2011
Music organizations based in Turkey